Minino is a rural locality (a village) in Novlenskoye Rural Settlement, Vologodsky District, Vologda Oblast, Russia. The population was 42 as of 2002.

Geography 
The distance to Vologda is 98 km, to Novlenskoye is 17 km. Voronino is the nearest rural locality.

References 

Rural localities in Vologodsky District